Erawan is the Khmer and Thai name of the mythological elephant Airavata. The name may also refer to:

Erawan Hotel, a former hotel in Bangkok
Erawan Shrine, a shrine to the god Brahma in Bangkok, located at the hotel
Grand Hyatt Erawan, a hotel in Bangkok, replacing the Erawan
The Erawan Group, a Thai hospitality company which owns the new hotel
Erawan Museum, a private museum in Samut Prakan Province, Thailand
Erawan National Park, a national park in Kanchanaburi Province, Thailand, named after the Erawan Waterfalls within the park
Erawan District, a district (amphoe) of Loei Province, Thailand